The Seventh Lee Kuan Yew Cabinet is the seventh Cabinet of Singapore formed by Prime Minister Lee Kuan Yew. It was formed in 1985 after the 1984 Singaporean general election.

Ministers

Ministers of State and Parliamentary Secretaries

References 

Executive branch of the government of Singapore
Lists of political office-holders in Singapore
Cabinets established in 1985
1985 establishments in Singapore
Lee Kuan Yew